CJCJ-FM is a Canadian radio station broadcasting from Woodstock, New Brunswick at 104.1 FM. The station is currently owned and operated by Bell Media. The station broadcasts a country format branded as Pure Country 104.

History
CJCJ originally began broadcasting on 920 kHz in July 1959, and moved to FM in the early 2000s. Originally owned by Carleton-Victoria Broadcasting Limited, it was acquired in 1991 by Radio One Ltd. In 1999, Radio One was acquired by Telemedia, and in 2002, Telemedia was purchased by Standard Broadcasting. CJCJ was one of the stations that Standard in turn sold to Astral Media.

In 1989, Carleton-Victoria Broadcasting Co. Ltd. received approval from the Canadian Radio-television and Telecommunications Commission (CRTC) to operate two low-power AM transmitters at Plaster Rock on 990 kHz (40 watts), and Perth/Andover on 1140 kHz with 40 watts. These transmitters would rebroadcast the programs of CJCJ 920 Woodstock.

In 1998, Carleton-Victoria Broadcasting Co. Ltd. received approval from the CRTC to add an FM rebroadcaster at Grand Falls to operate on the frequency of 93.5 MHz. On June 7, 2000, Telemedia Radio Atlantic Ltd. received CRTC approval to add a transmitter for CIKX-FM Grand Falls at Plaster Rock, using the facilities of the CJCJ Woodstock rebroadcasting transmitter, CJCJ-2 Plaster Rock. As a result of the change, the CJCJ rebroadcasters CJCJ-1 Perth/Andover and CJCJ-2 Plaster Rock were deleted.

In May 2009, CJCJ changed its format to hot adult contemporary as CJ104.

In November 2020, the station flipped to country as Pure Country 104.

Former logo

References

External links
 Pure Country 104
 
 

Jcj
Jcj
Jcj
Woodstock, New Brunswick
Radio stations established in 1959
1959 establishments in New Brunswick